Gerald Herman Peter Item (17 November 1960 – 23 May 2019) was an Indonesian swimmer. He competed in numerous international sporting events representing Indonesia. At the 1978 Asian Games, he won seven medals. At the 1982 Asian Games, he collected three bronze medals in relay events. Item also participated in the Southeast Asian Games of 1977, 1979 and 1981 and received a total of seventeen individual medals (not counting relay events), including five gold in 1979 alone.

After retiring from swimming, he and his wife, Elfira Nasution, formed a swimming club named Elfira Swima Gemilang (ESG). He and his family left Indonesia in 2009 where he moved to Riverside, California and started coaching there.

Early life 
Item was born in Jakarta, Indonesia to Willem and Elsje Item. He went to Coronado High School in San Diego, California, where he also became a swimmer. During his time at high school, he won two CIF event which led his team to a CIF title.

Death 

He died while coaching in Riverside on 23 May 2019.

References 

1960 births
2019 deaths
Minahasa people
Indonesian male swimmers
Swimming coaches
Indonesian emigrants to the United States
Sportspeople from Jakarta
20th-century Indonesian people
Asian Games medalists in swimming
Asian Games silver medalists for Indonesia
Asian Games bronze medalists for Indonesia
Swimmers at the 1978 Asian Games
Swimmers at the 1982 Asian Games
Medalists at the 1978 Asian Games
Medalists at the 1982 Asian Games